TUL Cup is the present name of the football championship of Finnish Workers' Sports Federation (TUL). It has been played in different formations since 1920. In the last two decades TUL Cup has been played as a pre-season competition. Final tournament is held in different city each year. The 2013 and 2015 TUL Cup finals were cancelled due to lack of participants and the 2020 finals due to the COVID-19 pandemic.

Between 1920 and 1947 the Workers' Sports Federation's clubs did not play in the same series as the teams of Finnish Football Association. In 1945—1947 the winners of TUL's series and Football Association's Mestaruussarja were playing for the Finnish championship title.

Winners

See also 
Finnish Workers' Sports Federation football team

Football cup competitions in Finland